Jacob H. Patten House is a historic home located in the former village of Lansingburgh at Troy, Rensselaer County, New York. It was built in 1881–1882, and is a two-story, two-bay-wide by three-bay-deep, Italianate style brick dwelling.  It sits on a brick and stone foundation and a pitched roof hidden by a low parapet.  The front facade features a one-story, shallow, hipped roof porch with square, chamfered columns and brackets. Also on the property is a contributing two-story carriage house (c. 1881–1882).

It was listed on the National Register of Historic Places in 2016.

References

Houses on the National Register of Historic Places in New York (state)
Italianate architecture in New York (state)
Houses completed in 1882
Houses in Troy, New York
National Register of Historic Places in Troy, New York